Eyjólfur Gjafar Sverrisson (born 3 August 1968) is an Icelandic former footballer and former coach of the Iceland national football team.

He is the father of Hólmar Örn Eyjólfsson, also a professional footballer.

Football

Playing career

Club career
Eyjólfur started his career as a striker at local team UMF Tindastóll and moved to VfB Stuttgart in 1989. He played for Stuttgart until 1994 and became a German champion in 1992. After five seasons, he moved to play in midfield for Beşiktaş J.K. in Turkey and became Turkish champion with the team in 1995. He left them at the end of that season and changed to Hertha BSC, where he helped securing promotion to the Bundesliga in 1997 and won the DFB-Ligapokal in 2001. In his last couple of seasons he played as a defender.

During his Bundesliga career, Eyjólfur played 251 matches and scored 30 goals.

International career
He was capped66 times for Iceland, making his debut in a Euro 1992 qualifying match in May 1991 against Albania. During the 1990s he was one of the stars of the national team and also skippered them. His last international came in October 2001, in a World cup qualifier against Denmark which Iceland lost 0–6 away.

Coaching career
In October 2005 he was appointed the coach of the Iceland national football team, where he has struggled, only winning two of his first 14 competitive games. Eyjólfur was sacked on 27 October 2007.

While managing the Iceland U21 men's football team, he signed a short-term contract as assistant with VfL Wolfsburg on 10 February 2011. He left the position as manager for Iceland U21 in the beginning of January 2019.

Coaching career statistics

Basketball

Club career
Eyjólfur started his basketball career with Tindastóll and was a key member of the team that won the Icelandic Division II in 1986. He had a stellar first season in the Icelandic Division I with Tindastóll and averaged a league leading 26.4 points in 20 games. The next season Eyjólfur upped his average to 32.8 points per game, including a season high 50 points against Skallagrímur, again leading the league in scoring, His performance helped the club win the Icelandic Division I and achieve promotion to the top-tier Icelandic Úrvalsdeild. Eyjólfur was the second leading scorer of the Úrvalsdeild karla for the 1988–1989 season, averaging 24.2 points per game and was selected to the Icelandic All-Star game in February 1989. It was his final full season in basketball as the next season he moved to VfB Stuttgart to fully focus on his football career.

International career
Eyjólfur played 10 games for the Icelandic junior national teams. In August 1989, he was selected to a 20-player training camp with the Icelandic national team but was unable to attend due to scheduling conflicts with Tindastóll's football games.

References

External links

Úrvalsdeild statistics (basketball)

Sverrisson, Eyjolfur
2. Bundesliga players
Beşiktaş J.K. footballers
Bundesliga players
Expatriate footballers in Germany
Expatriate footballers in Turkey
Hertha BSC players
Iceland international footballers
Iceland national football team managers
Icelandic football managers
Icelandic expatriate footballers
Icelandic footballers
Icelandic men's basketball players
Sverrisson, Eyjolfur
People from Sauðárkrókur
Süper Lig players
VfB Stuttgart players
Icelandic expatriate sportspeople in Turkey
Association football midfielders
Association football defenders
Association football forwards
Association football utility players
Úrvalsdeild karla (basketball) players
Ungmennafélagið Tindastóll men's basketball players
Shooting guards
Ungmennafélagið Tindastóll men's football players